The Archdiocese of Brisbane may refer to:

 Anglican Diocese of Brisbane, Australia
 Roman Catholic Archdiocese of Brisbane, Australia